Panzer Corps 2 is a computer wargame developed by Flashback Games and published by Slitherine Software for Windows on March 19, 2020. It is a sequel to Panzer Corps.

Gameplay
Panzer Corps 2 is a World War II turn-based strategic wargame played on a hex grid. It features a 60-mission branching campaign from the German perspective. New features in the sequel are 3D graphics and an undo system. There is co-op and player versus player multiplayer, either via online, hotseat, or play-by-mail methods.

Release
Panzer Corps 2 was announced on March 8, 2017. Seven downloadable content (DLC) packs have been released.

Reception

Panzer Corps received "generally favorable" reviews according to review aggregator Metacritic. Many compared the game to the Panzer General series.

Jonathan Bolding of PC Gamer summarized: "Panzer Corps 2 is ultimately a fun, robust, and quite pretty wargame. It has a lot to recommend it, but it truly excels in no particular category. Despite all this work it still falls into the complexity-over-substance trap of so many wargames in the past 20 years."

Luke Plunkett of Kotaku said the game has "[a] fantastic mix of puzzle-like engagements with spacious strategic manoeuvring" but called the final missions "bullshit" and the encirclement system "kinda broken".

Tim Stone of Rock Paper Shotgun gave a negative review and said: " [...] loyalty to its predecessors means most of the time it feels more like a tough military puzzle game than an insightful simulation of mid-20th Century warfare."

Bill Gray of Wargamer gave a positive review, saying: "If you liked Panzer General and the original Panzer Corps, then PC2 is a must buy." Joe Fonseca reviewed the Axis Operations 1941 expansion also for Wargamer: "Staying true to Panzer Corps 2's tried-and-tested formula, Axis Operations 1941 brings unique scenarios and a refreshing setting to the WW2 wargame, making it a no-brainer for fans of the series."

References

External links
Panzer Corps 2 at Flashback Games

2020 video games
Computer wargames
Multiplayer and single-player video games
Multiplayer hotseat games
Multiplayer online games
Play-by-email video games
Slitherine Software games
Turn-based strategy video games
Unreal Engine games
Video games about Nazi Germany
Video games with downloadable content
Video games with expansion packs
Video games with Steam Workshop support
Windows games
Windows-only games
World War II video games
Flashback Games games